Conor Stephen James Hubble (born 29 November 1994) is an English footballer who plays as a midfielder for Canvey Island. He came through the youth ranks at Queens Park Rangers, before joining Colchester United's Academy, where he made his Football League debut in 2013. He had two loan spells at Leiston before joining permanently in 2015 following his release from Colchester. He then joined Billericay Town in the summer of 2015.

Career

Hailing from Chelmsford, Hubble began his career at Queens Park Rangers, where he served his apprenticeship. After being told he would not be retained at QPR, he went on trial with Colchester United's Academy in the latter half of the 2012–13 season, featuring in a number of games for the under-21 development squad at the age of 18.

An attack-minded midfielder, Hubble was signed by Colchester on 2 July 2013 to link up with the club's under-21 team. He featured in a number of first-team pre-season friendlies in preparation for the 2013–14 season, scoring in the U's 2–1 friendly victory against Bury Town on 24 July.

Hubble made his professional and Football League debut on 21 September 2013, coming on as an 84th-minute substitute for Colchester's on-loan winger Jeffrey Monakana in a 1–1 draw with Crawley Town at the Colchester Community Stadium.

On 11 January 2014, Hubble and fellow Colchester academy player Jack Simmons joined Leiston for a one-month loan period, linking up with former U's player and academy coach Steve Ball. He made his debut for the club the same day as a substitute for Simmons, coming on after 60 minutes in a 2–2 draw with Lewes. He also made appearances in away wins at Wingate & Finchley and Canvey Island. He then scored in a 2–0 away victory at Bury Town on 4 February.

Hubble had a further loan at Leiston during the 2014–15 season, making his second debut on 25 October and grabbing himself a goal in their 3–2 victory over Bognor Regis Town. He grabbed an assist and the man of the match honours three days later as Leiston defeated Grays Athletic 3–0. He also made three appearances in the qualifying rounds of the FA Trophy, providing an assist in the 2–2 draw with Leighton Town on 1 November, netting in the 5–2 replay win on 4 November, and providing another assist in the 3–2 win over Paulton Rovers on 15 November. He featured in Leiston's 3–1 league win over Canvey Island on 8 November, and made his final appearance in a 2–0 win against Wingate & Finchley, providing the assists for both goals.

On 19 March 2015, Hubble was released by mutual consent from his Colchester United contract. He joined Leiston on a permanent basis, making a goalscoring debut on 28 March in a 2–1 win over Tonbridge Angels. He made six appearances until the end of the season for the club, playing in defeats to Leatherhead and Bury Town, and he scored a stoppage time equaliser in a 2–2 draw with Bognor Regis Town on 11 April. Hubble provided an assist for Leiston's goal in the 1–1 draw with Canvey Island on 18 April, and provided another assist in their 2–1 defeat to Hendon in their final game of the season on 25 April, earning himself the 'Player of the Match' award.

Ahead of the 2015–16 Isthmian League season, Hubble joined Billericay Town on 11 August 2015. He rejoined Leiston in January 2017. He subsequently joined Coggeshall Town in the summer. In October 2019, Hubble signed for Maldon & Tiptree, making 19 league appearances, scoring four goals. In August 2020, Hubble signed for Canvey Island.

Career statistics

References

External links

1994 births
Living people
Sportspeople from Chelmsford
English footballers
Association football midfielders
Queens Park Rangers F.C. players
Colchester United F.C. players
Leiston F.C. players
Billericay Town F.C. players
Coggeshall Town F.C. players
Maldon & Tiptree F.C. players
Canvey Island F.C. players
English Football League players
Isthmian League players